Ksenia Pecherkina (born 10 February 1993 in Chelyabinsk) is an ice dancer who competes for Latvia. With partner Aleksandrs Jakushin, she is the 2010 Latvian national champion.

Programs 
(with Jakushin)

Results 
(with Jakushin)

References

External links 

 

Latvian female ice dancers
1993 births
Living people
Sportspeople from Chelyabinsk
20th-century Latvian women